Punctoterebra paucincisa is a species of sea snail, a marine gastropod mollusk in the family Terebridae, the auger snails.

Description
The size of an adult shell varies between 16 mm and 40 mm.

Distribution
This species occurs in the Pacific Ocean off the Philippines, New Caledonia and the Fiji Islands.

References
Notes

Bibliography
 Terryn Y. (2007). Terebridae: A Collectors Guide. Conchbooks & NaturalArt. 59pp + plates
 Terryn, Y. (2021). The description of two 'overlooked' species of Terebridae (Gastropoda: Conoidea). Gloria Maris. 60(2): 110-116. page(s): 110-111, pl. 1 figs 2-6

External links
 
 Bratcher T. (1988). Six new species of Terebridae (Mollusca: Gastropoda) from Panama and the Indo-West Pacific. The Veliger. 30(4): 412-416
 Fedosov, A. E.; Malcolm, G.; Terryn, Y.; Gorson, J.; Modica, M. V.; Holford, M.; Puillandre, N. (2020). Phylogenetic classification of the family Terebridae (Neogastropoda: Conoidea). Journal of Molluscan Studies

Terebridae
Gastropods described in 1988